Jean-Claude Bernard (born 30 April 1933) is a French hurdler. He competed in the men's 110 metres hurdles at the 1956 Summer Olympics.

References

External links
 

1933 births
Living people
Athletes (track and field) at the 1956 Summer Olympics
French male hurdlers
Olympic athletes of France
Place of birth missing (living people)
Mediterranean Games bronze medalists for France
Mediterranean Games medalists in athletics
Athletes (track and field) at the 1955 Mediterranean Games
20th-century French people
21st-century French people